Michael Helber (born 4 October 1970) is a German badminton player. He competed at the Summer Olympics in 1996 and 2000. Helber was the bronze medalist at the 1989 European Junior Championships in the mixed doubles event partnered with Kerstin Weinborner. Played for the Fortuna Regensburg, he had won five consecutive men's doubles title at the German National Championships partnered with Michael Keck in 1995 and 1996; and with Björn Siegemund in 1997, 1998 and 1999.

Achievements

European Junior Championships 
Mixed doubles

IBF International
Men's doubles

Mixed doubles

References

External links
 
 

1970 births
Living people
Sportspeople from Bochum
German male badminton players
Olympic badminton players of Germany
Badminton players at the 2000 Summer Olympics
Badminton players at the 1996 Summer Olympics